Bagan Archaeological Museum is located in Bagan, Myanmar. It was established in 1904, near the Ananda Temple and was reconstructed in 1938. In the Second World War, the artifacts were buried in the earth to avoid destruction. In 1952, when Myanmar became independent, the Ministry of Culture started manging the museum. The three-story museum houses a number of rare Bagan period objects including the original Myazedi inscriptions, the Rosetta stone of Burma.

History
In 1901, the Governor General of India arrived in the Bagan region to prevent the destruction of ancient art works and ancient religious buildings. Emanuel_Forchhammer, a professor of Pali at Rangoon College, was entrusted with the task of preserving it. In 1902, Taw Sein Ko, head of the Department of Inscriptions and Stones (now the Department of Archaeology), collected ancient stone inscriptions and artifacts from around Bagan. To display them, a small museum was built in 1904 to the north of the Ananda Temple, where ancient stone inscriptions were displayed.

On October 14, 1994, the chairman of the National Peace and Development Council, General Than Shwe, who visited Bagan region , guided the construction of a large museum in Bagan. The museum opened on April 17, 1998. At the time of the construction of the building, the previous eight-point museum was kept, and the office of the Department of Archeology next to it was dismantled. According to State media report, a total of 295,284 local and foreign travellers visited the Bagan Archaeological Museum in the 2018-2019 fiscal year.

Featured galleries 

The galleries on display at the Bagan Archaeological Museum are 
Special gallery
Pagan Art Gallery
Pagan period architecture gallery
Pagan life gallery
Pagan period literature gallery
Pagan period Buddha statues
Pagan period mural art gallery

References

External links

1904 establishments in Burma
Archaeological museums
Bagan
Buildings and structures in Mandalay Region
Museums established in 1904
Museums in Myanmar